Kamal Huseynagha oglu Mammadbeyov (March 20, 1924 – September 2, 1997) was an architect, researcher, Azerbaijani and Soviet scientist, academician of the International Academy of Architecture of the Eastern Countries, honored architect of Azerbaijan SSR. He has a PhD in theory and history of architecture and restoration of architectural monuments.

Mammadbeyov carried out the first studies in architecture and urban planning of the city of Sumgait. The result of years of research were numerous scientific publications and a book about architectural and planning development of the city. Kamal Mammadbeyov donated a large number of graphics and illustrations made by him to the archives of The Sumgait City Museum.

He was also a scientific editor for several scientific publications.

See also
Mammadbeyov, noble family of Azerbaijan
Mgeladze, noble family of Georgia

References

1924 births
1997 deaths
People from Quba
Azerbaijani nobility
Azerbaijani academics

Azerbaijani people of Georgian descent
20th-century Azerbaijani architects
People from Sumgait
Soviet academics
Soviet architects